Halstead Road Centenary Pasture is a   local nature reserve in Mountsorrel in Leicestershire. It is owned and managed by Charnwood Borough Council.

This unimproved flower meadow has surviving medieval ridge and furrow. An outcrop of granite is covered with lichens and mosses, and there is a hawthorn and sloe hedge. Birds include yellowhammers and linnets.

There is access from Halstead Road.

References

Local Nature Reserves in Leicestershire